Kernodle-Pickett House is a historic home located at Bellemont, Alamance County, North Carolina. It was built in 1895–1896, and consists of a -story, "L"-shaped frame main block with -story frame wings in the Queen Anne style. It sits on a brick pier foundation and has a multi-gable roof with embossed tin shingles. The house features a variety of molded, sawn, and turned millwork.

It was added to the National Register of Historic Places in 1987.

References

Houses on the National Register of Historic Places in North Carolina
Queen Anne architecture in North Carolina
Houses completed in 1896
Houses in Alamance County, North Carolina
National Register of Historic Places in Alamance County, North Carolina